In functional analysis, the Friedrichs extension is a canonical self-adjoint extension of a non-negative densely defined symmetric operator. It is named after the mathematician Kurt Friedrichs. This extension is particularly useful in situations where an operator may fail to be essentially self-adjoint or whose essential self-adjointness is difficult to show.

An operator T is non-negative if

Examples

Example.  Multiplication by a non-negative function on an L2 space is a non-negative self-adjoint operator.

Example.  Let U be an open set in Rn.  On L2(U) we consider differential operators of the form

where the functions ai j are infinitely differentiable real-valued functions on U.  We consider T acting on the dense subspace of infinitely differentiable complex-valued functions of compact support, in symbols

If for each x ∈ U the n × n matrix

is non-negative semi-definite, then T is a non-negative operator. This means (a) that the matrix is hermitian and

for every choice of complex numbers c1, ..., cn.  This is proved using integration by parts.

These operators are elliptic although in general elliptic operators may not be non-negative.  They are however bounded from below.

Definition of Friedrichs extension 

The definition of the Friedrichs extension is based on the theory of closed positive forms on Hilbert spaces. 
If T is non-negative, then

is a sesquilinear form on dom T and

Thus Q defines an inner product on dom T.  Let H1 be the completion of dom T with respect to Q. H1 is an abstractly defined space; for instance its elements can be represented as equivalence classes of Cauchy sequences of elements of dom T.   It is not obvious that all elements in H1 can be identified with elements of H.  However, the following can be proved:

The canonical inclusion

extends to an injective continuous map H1 → H.  We regard H1 as a subspace of H.

Define an operator A by

 

In the above formula, bounded is relative to the topology on H1 inherited from H.  By the Riesz representation theorem  applied to the linear functional φξ extended to H, there is a unique A ξ ∈ H such that

Theorem. A is a non-negative self-adjoint operator such that T1=A - I extends T.

T1 is the Friedrichs extension of T.

Krein's theorem on non-negative self-adjoint extensions 

M. G. Krein has given an elegant characterization of all non-negative self-adjoint extensions of a non-negative symmetric operator T.

If T, S are non-negative self-adjoint operators, write

if, and only if,

 
 

Theorem.  There are unique self-adjoint extensions Tmin and Tmax of any non-negative symmetric operator T such that

and every non-negative self-adjoint extension S of  T is between Tmin and Tmax, i.e.

See also
 Energetic extension
 Extensions of symmetric operators

Notes

References
 N. I. Akhiezer and I. M. Glazman, Theory of Linear Operators in Hilbert Space, Pitman, 1981.

Operator theory
Linear operators